Escola Naval (Portuguese for "Naval School") may refer to:

Brazilian Naval School, the naval academy of Brazil
Portuguese Naval School, the naval academy of Portugal

Naval academies